Lorum may refer to:

 Lorum (card game), a Hungarian card game
 Lorum (piercing)
 Lorum, Iran, a village in Iran
 Lorum, County Carlow, a village in County Carlow, Ireland

See also
 Lorem ipsum